A Lavoisier Medal is an award named and given in honor of Antoine Lavoisier, considered by some to be a father of modern chemistry.

At least three organizations independently give awards for achievement in chemical-related disciplines, each using the name Lavoisier Medal.  Lavoisier Medals are awarded by the following organizations:

French Chemical Society (Société Chimique de France (SCF))

The French Chemical Society's Médaille Lavoisier is given for work or actions which have enhanced the perceived value of chemistry in society.

International Society for Biological Calorimetry (ISBC)
The ISBC's Lavoisier Medal is awarded to an internationally acknowledged scientist for an outstanding contribution to the development and/or the application of direct calorimetry in biology and medicine

Source: ISBC

1990: Ingemar Wadsö, Lund, Sweden
1992: Richard B. Kemp, Aberystwyth, UK
1994: Lee Hansen,  Provo, USA
1997: Ingolf Lamprecht, Berlin, Germany
1999: Anthony E. Beezer,  London, UK
2001: Lena Gustafsson, Göteborg, Sweden
2003: Erich Gnaiger,  Innsbruck, Austria
2006: Mario Monti, Lund, Sweden
2010: Edwin Battley, Stony Brook NY, USA
2014: Urs von Stockar, Lausanne, Switzerland

DuPont
The DuPont company's Lavoisier Medal for Technical Achievement is presented to DuPont scientists and engineers who have made outstanding contributions to DuPont and their scientific fields throughout their careers. Antoine Lavoisier mentored the founder of the company, E. I. du Pont, more than 200 years ago.

It was awarded 95 times from 1990 to 2013. Stephanie Louise Kwolek received the award in 1995.  As of June 2014, she is the only female DuPont employee to receive the honor.

Partial list of recipients
Source (1990-2012): Dupont 
Source: (2011 onwards): Dupont

 1990: Dr. Charles W. Todd
 1990: Thomas H. Chilton (posthumously awarded).
 1990: Nathaniel Wyeth
 1991: Crawford Greenewalt 
 1992: Herman E. Schroeder
 1993: Donald R. Johnson Pioneer of automatic clinical diagnostic instrumentation-Dupont Lavoisier Medal
 1995: Stephanie Kwolek
 1995: Herbert S. Eleuterio 
 1996: Owen Wright Webster
 1997: William C. Drinkard 
 1997: Charles Stine 
 1999: Albert Moore
 2000: Ivan Maxwell Robinson
 2002: Wilfred Sweeny
 2003: Rudolph Pariser
 2005: Vlodek Gabara, Harry Kamack, Mel Kohan
 2007: Edward J. Deyrup, Charles Joseph Noelke
 2008: D. Peter Carlson, Noel C. Scrivner
 2009: Calvin Chi-Ching Chien, George P. Lahm
 2010: Robert L. Segebart
 2011: Marc C. Albertsen
 2012: Scott V. Tingey
 2013: Mario Nappa
 2014: Steve Taylor, Dave Estell
 2015: Stephen Smith, Ronald McKinney
 2016: Mick Ward, Tom Carney
 2017: Joe Lachowski, George Weber 
 2018: Andrew Morgan, Scott Power, Peter Trefonas
 2019: Mark Lamontia 
 2020: Andrew Morgan
 2021: Mark Barger, Peter Berg
 2022: Theresa Weston, Todd Buley

See also

 List of chemistry awards
 List of engineering awards

Notes

Chemistry awards
Materials science awards
Chemical engineering awards